Davies Gilbert  (born Davies Giddy, 6 March 1767 – 24 December 1839) was an English engineer, author, and politician. He was elected to the Royal Society on 17 November 1791 and served as President of the Royal Society from 1827 to 1830. He changed his name to Gilbert in 1817.

Biography
Davies Giddy was born on 6 March 1767, the second of the three children of Reverend Edward Giddy, curate of St Erth's church, and his wife Catherine, daughter of Henry Davies of Tredrea, St Erth in Cornwall. His parents' first child, also Davies by forename, died within 24 hours of birth in 1766, and their third child, Mary Philippa Davies Giddy (known as Philippa) was born in 1769. The Giddy family moved to Penzance, living on Chapel Street in 1775, until Giddy's mother Catherine inherited the family home of Tredrea back in St Erth. By 1780 the family returned to St Erth, and Davies was taught by his father, alongside his sister Philippa.  Davies Giddy would later adopt Gilbert as his surname, the maiden name of his wife, the agronomist Mary Ann Gilbert, whom he married at Easter of 1808.

Davies was educated first at Penzance Grammar School and then by his father, and by Rev Malachy Hitchins, the mathematical astronomer. At the age of 17, at the recommendation of Hitchins, he was sent to Bristol to join the Mathematical Academy of Benjamin Donne where he remained for three years. His sister Philippa simultaneously finished her own schooling with the famous bluestocking Hannah More. He went up to Pembroke College, Oxford in 1786, whence he graduated with a MA on 29 June 1789.

Davies was High Sheriff of Cornwall from 1792 to 1793. He served in the House of Commons as Member of Parliament for Helston in Cornwall from 1804 to 1806 and for Bodmin from 1806 to 1832.

Giddy was an intimate friend of physician Thomas Beddoes, had attended Beddoes' lectures at Oxford when Beddoes had become University Reader in Chemistry in 1788 and had been a confidant of Beddoes in his plans for the Pneumatic Institution in Bristol. He noticed and encouraged Humphry Davy and convinced Beddoes that Davy was the man to work in the laboratory at the Institution.

The Dictionary of National Biography article says of him:

"Gilbert's importance to the development of science in the early nineteenth century lay in his faith that science provided the best means to tackle practical problems and in his facility as a parliamentary promoter of scientific ventures." 

His mathematical skills were sought by early engineering pioneers such as Jonathan Hornblower, Richard Trevithick and Thomas Telford. He also had an interest in the history and culture of Cornwall. For instance, he removed a Celtic cross from near Truro, on the Redruth Road (where it had found new use as a gatepost), and took it to a churchyard in his new home of Eastbourne. When asked why he carried off a Cornish Cross and re-erected it in Eastbourne by the Rev. Canon Hockin, of Phillack, Davies replied, It was to show the poor, ignorant folk that there was something bigger in the world than a flint!

He assembled and published A Parochial History of Cornwall and collected and published a number of Cornish Carols.

He edited for publication a Cornish Language poem about the Passion: Passyon agan Arluth, as Mount Calvary (1826). He was elected to the Society of Antiquaries in 1820. Gilbert was the President of the Royal Geological Society of Cornwall from its foundation in 1814 until his death. He was elected a Foreign Honorary Member of the American Academy of Arts and Sciences in 1832.

Davies Gilbert was opposed to mass education during his time in parliament. When the Parochial Schools Bill of 1807 was debated in the Commons, Tory MP Davies Gilbert warned the House that:
"However specious in theory the project might be of giving education to the labouring classes of the poor, it would, in effect, be found to be prejudicial to their morals and happiness; it would teach them to despise their lot in life, instead of making them good servants in agriculture and other laborious employments to which their rank in society had destined them; instead of teaching them the virtue of subordination, it would render them factious and refractory, as is evident in the manufacturing counties; it would enable them to read seditious pamphlets, vicious books and publications against Christianity; it would render them insolent to their superiors; and, in a few years, the result would be that the legislature would find it necessary to direct the strong arm of power towards them and to furnish the executive magistrates with more vigorous powers than are now in force. Besides, if this Bill were to pass into law, it would go to burthen the country with a most enormous and incalculable expense, and to load the industrious orders with still heavier imposts. (Hansard, House of Commons, Vol. 9, Col. 798, 13 July 1807, quoted in Chitty 2007:15–16)"

He died in Eastbourne in Sussex on Christmas Eve 1839.

Marriage and family
On 18 April 1808 he married Mary Ann Gilbert, and in 1816 he took his wife's surname, Gilbert, to perpetuate it. This enabled the couple to inherit the extensive property in Sussex of her uncle, Thomas Gilbert, who had no male heir.
 
Three daughters and a son survived him. Their son, John Davies Gilbert (5 December 1811 – 16 April 1854) was elected a Fellow of the Royal Society in April 1834 but does not seem to have published any scientific work. Their eldest daughter, Catherine, married John Samuel Enys (b. 1796) on 17 April 1834. She was the mother of the notable New Zealand naturalist, John Enys (11 October 1837 – 7 November 1912). Their second daughter, Annie, married Rev. Henry Owen, rector of Heveningham, Suffolk on 4 December 1851. The other daughters were Mary Susannah and Hester Elizabeth.

Publications
Books and publications written or edited by Davies Gilbert include:

 Plain Statement of the Bullion Question (1811)
  Some ancient Christmas Carols, with the Tunes to which they were formerly sung in the West of England. Collected by D. Gilbert.  London : J. Nichols and Son, (1822).
  Some ancient Christmas Carols, with the tunes to which they were formerly sung in the west of England. pp. x. 79. J. Nichols and Son: London, 1823
  "On the vibrations of heavy bodies in cycloidal and in circular arches, as compared with their descents through free space; including an estimate of the variable circular excess in vibrations continually decreasing." By Davies Gilbert, .. London : printed by William Clowes, [1823] 15,[3]p. 'Extracted from the Quarterly Journal, Vol. XV'.
  A Cornish Cantata. [Names of places in Cornwall arranged in the form of verses.] [Privately printed? East-Bourn?] 1826.
  Mount Calvary; or, the History of the Passion, Death and Resurrection of Jesus Christ, written in Cornish (as it may be conjectured) some centuries past. Interpreted in English, in ... 1682, by J. Keigwin . Edited by D. Gilbert. pp. xxii. 96. Nichols and Son: London, 1826.
  "On the expediency of assigning Specific Names to all such Functions of Simple Elements as represent definite physical properties; with the suggestion of a new term in mechanics; illustrated by an investigation of the Machine moved by Recoil" ... From the Philosophical Transactions. pp. 14. [Privately printed:] London, 1827.
  "Some Collections and Translations respecting St. Neot, and the former state of his Church." In : Hedgeland (J. P.) A Description ... of the ... decorations ... in the Church of St. Neot, etc. 1830.
  A Cornish dialogue between Tom Pengersick and Dic. Trengurtha. East-Bourn : Davies Gilbert, [ca. 1835](In verse.)
The Parochial History of Cornwall, Founded on the Manuscript Histories of Mr. Hals and Mr. Tonkin; with Additions and Various Appendices, 4 vols., London, 1838. (includes copious extracts from J. Whitaker, Daniel Lysons and Samuel Lysons, &c. and geological notices by Dr. Boase). 
Vol.1, London, 1838
Vol.2, London, 1838
Vol.3, London, 1838
Vol.4, London, 1838

In 1831, Gilbert gave evidence to a Parliamentary select committee on steam carriages, which is included in the committee's report, published in 1834.

See also
 List of presidents of the Royal Society

References

External links 

  Note: The low count is wrong – search Hansard with "Davies Giddy" and "Davies Gilbert".
 Davies Gilbert Biography in hymnsandcarolsofchristmas.com website
 
Obituary in The Gentleman's Magazine, Vol.13 (New series) 1840 Jan – June, Page 208–211.  Online in Google Books

 
 

1767 births
1839 deaths
People from St Erth
Writers from Cornwall
Politicians from Cornwall
Historians of Cornwall
High Sheriffs of Cornwall
Fellows of the American Academy of Arts and Sciences
Fellows of the Royal Society
Presidents of the Royal Society
Presidents of the Royal Geological Society of Cornwall
Tory MPs (pre-1834)
UK MPs 1802–1806
UK MPs 1806–1807
UK MPs 1807–1812
UK MPs 1812–1818
UK MPs 1818–1820
UK MPs 1820–1826
UK MPs 1826–1830
UK MPs 1830–1831
UK MPs 1831–1832
Engineers from Cornwall
Members of the Parliament of the United Kingdom for Helston
Members of the Parliament of the United Kingdom for Bodmin